Theodore Conkey (December 11, 1819March 17, 1880) was a Wisconsin pioneer, Union Army officer, and businessman.  He was a member of the Wisconsin State Senate and the Wisconsin State Assembly.

Biography
Conkey was born in Canton, New York, son of Asa Conkey and Mary Nash.  His father was a farmer, and had served in the U.S. Army during the War of 1812. He left his father's farm in 1841, moving first to Fond du Lac, in the Wisconsin Territory, then settling for a year in Madison, where he taught school. He returned to Fond du Lac and took up a new career in civil engineering, where he conducted U.S. government surveys of land in Wisconsin. As a surveyor, he apprenticed under Albert Gallatin Ellis, who had been surveyor general of the Wisconsin and Iowa district.  Together, they surveyed large tracts of northern Wisconsin.

Conkey determined that the Grand Chute rapids would provide an ideal source for water-power, and in early 1849, in partnership with Morgan Lewis Martin and Abraham B. Bowen, they selected a tract of land on the north side of the Fox River to start a village.  Conkey surveyed and platted the land where the city would be built, and in July 1849, moved his family to the area, becoming one of the original pioneers of Appleton, Wisconsin. Conkey constructed a saw mill, and performed contract construction projects in the area.  He was invested in improvements on the Fox and Wisconsin Rivers, partnering again with Morgan Lewis Martin.

In 1861, at news of the outbreak of the American Civil War, Conkey sold his mill and decided to help raise a company of men for the Union Army.  His volunteers were incorporated into the 3rd Wisconsin Volunteer Cavalry Regiment as Company I, and Conkey was named Captain of that company.  The regiment was attached to the Army of the Frontier and served almost the entire war in Missouri, Kansas, and Arkansas.  He mustered out of the service as lieutenant colonel of the regiment a few months after the close of the war.

He returned to Wisconsin November 1865 and resumed the milling business, investing with Charles Pfennig.  On his partner's death, Conkey bought out the other investors.  He invested in enlarging and improving the mill, and was involved in running it until 1879, when he sold to Kimblerly, Clark & Co.  Conkey effectively retired from business after this sale.

An Episcopalian, Conkey married Cynthia F. Foote in June 1848. They had four children, three survived to adulthood.

Political career
Conkey was a member of the Wisconsin Senate from 1851 to 1852. Perhaps his most important legislative contribution in the Senate was his act in 1851 to split off the western part of Brown county and create a new county named "Outagamie." Conkey later represented Outagamie county in the Wisconsin Assembly in 1857.  He also served on the Appleton City Council and on the Outagamie County Board.  He was a Democrat.

References

External links

People from Canton, New York
Politicians from Fond du Lac, Wisconsin
Democratic Party Wisconsin state senators
People of Wisconsin in the American Civil War
Union Army colonels
1819 births
1880 deaths
19th-century American politicians
Democratic Party members of the Wisconsin State Assembly